Trevor Dance (born 31 July 1958) is an English former football goalkeeper who played 84 league games in the Football League for Port Vale between 1975 and 1980. He also played for non-league sides Stafford Rangers, Altrincham, and Telford United, and also played for American club Cleveland Cobras.

Career
Dance joined Port Vale as an apprentice in August 1975, signing his first professional forms in July 1976, and making his debut in a 2–1 defeat at Mansfield Town on 28 December 1976. An understudy to John Connaughton, he made a highly impressive Vale Park debut on 10 January 1977, his saves were a key part of a 3–1 victory over Second Division Hull City in the FA Cup third round replay game. He finished the 1976–77 campaign with 12 appearances to his name, and featured eight times in 1977–78, as manager Roy Sproson was replaced by Bobby Smith, and the "Valiants" were relegated out of the Third Division. He was sent on loan to local rivals Stoke City in May 1978 and American Soccer League outfit Cleveland Cobras the next month, returning in August 1978. He became the regular Vale keeper in January 1979 under new boss Dennis Butler, and made 27 Fourth Division appearances in 1978–79. He played 40 games in 1979–80, and retained his first team place under new manager John McGrath. However he lost his first team place in August 1980, and was loaned out to non-league Stafford Rangers in September 1980, and signed a permanent deal the next month, Rangers paying Vale £10,000. He later played for non-league clubs Altrincham and Telford United.

Career statistics
Source:

References

1958 births
Living people
People from South Hetton
Footballers from County Durham
English footballers
Association football goalkeepers
Port Vale F.C. players
Stoke City F.C. players
English expatriate footballers
English expatriate sportspeople in the United States
Expatriate soccer players in the United States
Cleveland Cobras players
Stafford Rangers F.C. players
Altrincham F.C. players
Telford United F.C. players
English Football League players
National League (English football) players